Gbadolite Airport  is an airport serving Gbadolite, the capital of the Nord-Ubangi Province in the Democratic Republic of the Congo.

The Gbadolite VOR/DME (Ident: BLT) is located on the field.

History
Zairian President Mobutu had the airport built specifically so he could fly the Air France Concorde on chartered flights to Paris and elsewhere.

See also

Transport in Democratic Republic of the Congo
List of airports in Democratic Republic of the Congo

References

External links
 Gbadolite Airport at OpenStreetMap
 
 
 Gbadolite on the BBC

Airports in the Nord-Ubangi Province
Gbadolite